The St. Catharines municipal election of 1997 was held to elect a mayor and councillors for the city of St. Catharines, Ontario.

Results

 
Results taken from the Hamilton Spectator, 11 November 1997, B9. The final official results were not significantly different.

1997 Ontario municipal elections
1997